Aegires leuckartii is a species of sea slug, a nudibranch, a marine, opisthobranch gastropod mollusk in the family Aegiridae.

Distribution
This species was described from Nice, on the Mediterranean Sea coast of France. It has only been found on the French and Spanish coasts of the Mediterranean.

References

Aegiridae
Gastropods described in 1853